The 2016–17 FA Women's Premier League Cup is the 26th running of the competition, which began in 1991. It is the major League Cup competition run by the FA Women's Premier League, and for the third season it is being run alongside their secondary League Cup competition, the Premier League Plate.

All 72 Premier League clubs entered at the Determining round, with the winners continuing in the competition and the losers going into the Premier League Plate tournament.

Going into the tournament, Tottenham Hotspur is the reigning champions, having defeated Cardiff City 2–1 after extra time the previous season.

Results
All results listed are published by The Football Association. Games are listed by round in chronological order, and then in alphabetical order of the home team where matches were played simultaneously.

The division each team play in is indicated in brackets after their name: (S)=Southern Division; (N)=Northern Division; (SW1)=South West Division One; (SE1)=South East Division One; (M1)=Midlands Division One; (N1)=Northern Division One.

Qualifying round

Determining round
The competition begins with a Determining Round, which consisted of all 72 teams in the FA Women's Premier League being drawn in pairs. The winners of these 36 games progressed to the next stage of the competition, while the losers qualified for the 2016–17 FA Women's Premier League Plate.

Competition proper

First round
With 36 teams progressing from the determining round, four needed to be eliminated to allow a single-elimination knockout tournament to take place. Twenty eight of the winners from the determining round were given byes to the second round, with eight teams being drawn against each other in first round ties.

Second round

Third round

Quarter-finals

Semi-finals

Final

References

FA Women's National League Cup
Prem